Piz may refer to:
 Piz Gloria, a mountain-top restaurant in Switzerland
 Piz Buin, a mountain
 Piz Dolf, a mountain
 Piz Segnas, a mountain
 Piz Buin (brand), a suncream brand
 Piz (river), a river in Russia
 Stosh "Piz" Piznarski, a character from Veronica Mars
 PIZ (Compression Method), a compression method built into OpenEXR